Kildare Capes is a settlement on Prince Edward Island. It was named after Kildare in Ireland.

Communities in Prince County, Prince Edward Island